Cevallia is a genus of flowering plants belonging to the family Loasaceae.

Its native range is Southern Central USA to Northern Mexico.

Species:
 Cevallia sinuata Lag.

References

Loasaceae
Cornales genera